Caladenia latifolia, commonly known as pink fairies is a species of orchid endemic to Australia and is common and widespread in the southern half of the continent and in Tasmania. It has a single, hairy leaf and up to four pink (rarely white) flowers. It is easily distinguished by its relatively large, green leaf, and pink flowers on an unusually tall spike.

Description 
Caladenia latifolia is a terrestrial, perennial, deciduous, herb with an underground tuber and which often grows in large colonies. The leaf usually lies flat on the ground and is green and densely hairy on both sides. The back surface of the sepals and petal is a covered with glandular hairs and is a lighter shade of pink. The lateral lobes are pink with dark stripes, narrow oblong in shape, and sometimes have small teeth on the edge. The mid-lobe is white with a pinkish tip, triangular in shape and has three or four long, linear teeth on each side. There are two rows of yellowish calli with white tips in the centre of the labellum, forming a semi-circle. Flowering occurs from August to December.

This orchid sometimes forms hybrids with the cherry spider orchid (Caladenia gardneri) and with the cowslip orchid (Caladenia flava). On rare occasions it hybridises with the large white spider orchid (Caladenia longicauda subsp. longicauda).

Taxonomy and naming 
Caladenia latifolia was first described in 1810 by Robert Brown and the description was published in Prodromus Florae Novae Hollandiae. The specific epithet (latifolia) is derived from the Latin latus meaning "broad" and folium meaning "leaf", referring to the broad leaf of this species.

Four varieties have been described:
Caladenia latifolia var. angustifolia Benth.
Caladenia latifolia var. glandula Ewart & B.Wood
Caladenia latifolia R.Br. var. latifolia

Distribution and habitat 
Pink fairies occurs in Victoria, South Australia, Tasmania and Western Australia. In Victoria it mostly grows in near-coastal areas in sand and is only rarely found inland. In South Australia it is widespread in the south east where it grows in sand in near coastal areas. In Tasmania it grows in coastal scrub and heath in the north of the island. In Western Australia, pink fairies occurs between Kalbarri in the north and Israelite Bay in the south, growing in a wide range of habitats from coastal heath to the margins of inland salt lakes.

Conservation 
In Western Australia C. latifolia is classified as "Not Threatened" by the Western Australian Government Department of Parks and Wildlife.

References 

latifolia
Endemic orchids of Australia
Orchids of South Australia
Orchids of Tasmania
Orchids of Victoria (Australia)
Orchids of Western Australia
Plants described in 1810
Taxa named by Robert Brown (botanist, born 1773)